Nebula is a video-on-demand streaming service provider. Nebula was founded by Dave Wiskus and Standard creators and is meant to complement creators' other distribution channels, namely YouTube and podcast platforms. It is owned as a joint venture between Standard and the creators, with a minority holding by Curiosity Stream. Profits from subscriptions are divided 50/50 between creators and Standard based on watch time.

History 
The idea for Nebula was started and discussed as part of the Standard creator community discussions online and at VidCon, and Nebula launched on 23 May 2019, with about 75 creators. Nebula has grown substantially since starting, with over 140 creators who together have over 120 million collective YouTube subscribers and reaching over 500,000 subscribers  making it one of the most successful YouTube rival platforms. The service was nominated for best Influencer Campaign in the 10th Annual Streamy Awards. and Best Creator Product in the 11th Annual Streamy Awards. They have had a long-standing promotion with Curiosity Stream to promote a bundle subscription for both services; it was announced in September 2021 that Curiosity Stream bought a minority share of Nebula, valuing the company at over $50 million. In May 2022, Nebula Classes began hosting content creators' paid online courses.

Programming 
 Nebula has over 160 creators and channels, with most of the content also on YouTube or podcast platforms, but there are also Nebula Originals that are made by one or more creators and only available on the platform.  Most creators have some original content only on the platform, and most of the content on the platform is sponsorship free, unlike the same videos on YouTube, and there are no ads on the platform.  Nebula's parent company Standard also launched an in-house production company Standard Studios to help its creators with production, editing, and graphics for both Nebula Originals and videos that are also hosted both on Nebula and elsewhere.  The streaming service is mostly promoted through content creators promoting the site on their other platforms, as it does not pay to advertise elsewhere or have any publicists on staff.

Nebula's video content library is categorized in these categories: Animation, Explainers, Film & TV, Gaming, History, Music, Originals, Science & Engineering, Technology, and Writing. Some of its notable creators include Jordan Harrod, Hbomberguy, Lindsay Ellis, LegalEagle, MinuteEarth, Tom Scott, Extra Credits, Adam Neely, Rene Ritchie, RealLifeLore, Real Engineering, and Wendover Productions. Many of these creators are also some of the top Patreon earners, and have been called the "smart YouTuber mafia". Nebula also doubles as a podcast platform with various audio podcasts, mostly by the same creators as its video content. Nebula is accessible through multiple platforms, including computers, smartphones, tablets, or other smart devices via a modern web browser, or their iOS, Apple TV, Roku, Fire TV, Android TV and Android apps. Other device apps are being actively developed but not yet available.

References

External links 
 

Documentary film production companies
Subscription video on demand services
Streaming television
Film production companies of the United States
American companies established in 2019